The IWK Health Centre is a major pediatric hospital and trauma centre in Halifax, Nova Scotia that provides care to maritime youth, children and women from Nova Scotia, New Brunswick, Prince Edward Island and beyond. The IWK is the largest facility in Atlantic Canada caring for children, youth and adolescents, and is the only Level 1 pediatric trauma centre east of Quebec.

Location
The IWK Health Centre is located in the south end of Halifax. The front entrance is on University Avenue between Robie Street and Summer Street. The IWK emergency entrance is located on South Street.

History
The present-day IWK Health Centre traces its history to the development of two separate facilities, a pediatric hospital and a maternity hospital.

Pediatric hospital

In the early 20th century, a group of Halifax residents along with interested physicians proposed the idea of establishing a children's hospital in Halifax. A multi-year fundraising campaign ensued, raising $6,000 by 1907; later that year a donation of $10,000 by the late Mr. F.D. Corbett resulted in the beginning of construction of the Halifax Children's Hospital which opened for use in 1909. It was located on the east side of Robie Street on the block bounded by University Avenue and South Street; in 1922 the Grace Maternity Hospital would be built on the opposite (north) side of University Avenue. This early pediatric facility had no private beds and, since health care in Canada at that time was private, surgical and medical staff donated their services without charge. The building expanded in 1919 to increase bed capacity to 50, followed by a further expansion in 1931 to 90 beds, and finally 217 beds in 1955.

Mrs. Dorothy J. Killam donated $8 million toward construction of a new pediatric hospital in the memory of her late husband Izaak Walton Killam. Construction of the new Izaak Walton Killam Hospital for Children (informally nicknamed the IWK) began in 1967 and the $20 million 325-bed facility opened in 1970. The location chosen was immediately west and adjacent to the province's largest health care facility, the Victoria General Hospital, which was the teaching hospital associated with the Dalhousie University Faculty of Medicine; the IWK would continue the Halifax Children's Hospital's affiliation with the Faculty of Medicine's Department of Pediatrics. Upon the opening of the IWK in 1970, the historic Halifax Children's Hospital was demolished.

The Children's Hospital School of Nursing operated from 1916 until 1971, having trained and graduated 801 pediatric nurses over its existence.

Maternity hospital
In 1906 The Salvation Army purchased an old school in Halifax's South End as a haven for "fallen women". The facility was named Harrow House. Physicians there donated their time and the facility gained an excellent reputation for maternity care. The Halifax Explosion of December 6, 1917 gave momentum to the Halifax Medical Association's desire for a dedicated maternity institution, resulting in a resolution from that association on September 15, 1918 to Halifax City Council requesting funds for such a facility and that the Salvation Army be asked to run it. Dalhousie University offered the Salvation Army both land and funds to build and run the hospital.

The Grace Maternity Hospital (informally nicknamed the Grace) opened on April 29, 1922 as the only independent maternity hospital at that time in Canada; from the outset, the facility was affiliated as a teaching hospital with the Department of Pediatrics at Dalhousie University Faculty of Medicine. It was located on the east side of Robie Street on the block bounded by University Avenue and College Street; it was opposite the Halifax Children's Hospital which was located on the south side of University Avenue. The initial facility could accommodate 65 mothers and 65 babies. Major renovations to the facility took place in 1956, 1962, 1973 and 1977. In 1975 the Halifax Infirmary announced that it would no longer handle maternity cases, forcing the Grace to absorb its patients. By the 1970s the Grace occupied half a city block with 126 adult beds and 166 bassinets with 40 in the neo-natal intensive care unit (NICU).

According to the Halifax Mail Star of May 28, 1970, the children's hospital financed by the Killam Estate opened, despite the failed condition that the South Street Poor House be eliminated. Today, this hospital is gone, torn down after only 40 years for a much larger provincially funded building set much further back on the former Poor House property.

A Government of Nova Scotia proposal in the late 1970s to construct a new maternity facility for the Grace as part of the $120 million Camp Hill Medical Centre was postponed in 1982, forcing the Salvation Army to undertake an independent plan for a new Grace. By 1984, plans were underway to build a $30 million facility on the old site of the Halifax Children's Hospital which was adjacent to and immediately west of the Izaak Walton Killam Hospital for Children that had opened in 1970. The new Grace facility opened in 1992 bounding the block formed by University Avenue, Robie Street and South Street west of the IWK. The new  building was connected to the IWK to provide access to that facility's pediatric medicine departments. It was designed by Nycum Fowler Group and DuBois Plumb Partnership and won the 1994 Lieutenant Governor's Award for Architecture.  The old Grace Maternity Hospital located on the north side of the intersection of University Avenue and Robie Street was transferred to Dalhousie University and became home to the Faculty of Dentistry and the Faculty of Pharmacology.

The Grace Maternity School of Nursing opened in 1922 at the time the hospital itself opened, offering an 18-month course in Obstetrical and Newborn Nursing (these programs ended in 1959) and the school began a 3-year nursing program in affiliation with the Victoria General Hospital, Halifax Children's Hospital, Nova Scotia Sanatorium and Nova Scotia Hospital. The program ended in 1964, having trained and graduated almost 400 nurses over its existence.

1996 merger to present

In 1996 the Izaak Walton Killam Hospital for Children and the adjacent Grace Maternity Hospital merged to become the IWK Grace Hospital for Women, Children and Families. At that time a new "Link" building was constructed to join the separate buildings. In 2000 a helipad  was constructed on the southwest corner of the former Grace Maternity Hospital building; this proposal caused some concern in the adjacent residential area on the west side of Robie Street.

In 2001 the Salvation Army ended its involvement with the amalgamated institution and the name was simplified to become the IWK Health Centre which remains in current use as of 2013.

Inpatient units, perioperative facilities and ambulatory care space also saw major redevelopment. The most prominent exterior change to the facility was the addition of a parking garage accessed from University Avenue as well as an atrium connected to the Link Building. Today the IWK Health Centre terms the former Izaak Walton Killam Hospital for Children as the "Children's Site" and the former Grace Maternity Hospital building as the "Women's Site". Around 2006 two floors were added to the link building, which provided  of additional space.

On June 24, 2013, philanthropist Marjorie Lindsay announced she would be donating $1 million to help fund the construction of a new inpatient mental health unit due to open in 2014.
The Garron Center for Child and Adolescent Mental Health opened for patients on May 14, 2014.

Education and research
The IWK is a teaching hospital and is affiliated with Dalhousie University. The hospital is also renowned as a research hospital in the areas of children's and women's health.

Telethon
In 1985, CBC Television affiliates began airing the Children's Miracle Network telethon. CHSJ-TV, the private CBC station and the last private CBC station province wide simultaneously aired the telethon for 10 years. The Telethon aired at the IWK and the CBHT studios until 1994. The IWK logo changed in 1996. In 1995, CTV Atlantic began airing the telethon. Various CBC stations stopped airing Children's Miracle Network telethons in the 1990s, except for CBNT-DT, which aired the telethon until 2011 for the Janeway Telethon. Steve Murphy has been hosting the telethon since 1995 on CTV Atlantic (formerly ATV) when CBC stopped airing the telethon in 1994. The original host was Don Tremaine. The new host is Todd Battis.

Statistics
 Approximately 5,000 babies are delivered at the IWK Health Centre each year.
 There are more than 3,200 employees at the IWK Health Centre.
 Approximately 29,170 patient visits to the emergency department each year.
 Approximately 1,298,717 tests are completed in laboratories at the IWK Health Centre each year.
 Approximately $20 million of funded research was underway at the IWK Health Centre in 2010.
 As of 2010, the IWK Health Center has 1,252 beds.

See also
 List of hospitals in Canada

Notes

References
 "The Izaak Walton Killam Hospital is born". Dalhousie University. Accessed February 10, 2006.
 "Dalhousie Medical Alumni Association (DMAA) Medical History Walking Tour". Dalhousie Medical Alumni Association/ Accessed February 12, 2006.

External links

 Official site
 IWK Foundation
 IWK Telethon for Children

Hospitals established in 1970
Children's hospitals in Canada
Hospitals in Halifax, Nova Scotia
Teaching hospitals in Canada
Heliports in Canada
Certified airports in Nova Scotia
Hospitals established in 1909